Charles Allen Culberson (June 10, 1855March 19, 1925) was an American political figure and Democrat who served as the 21st Governor of Texas from 1895 to 1899, and as a United States senator from Texas from 1899 to 1923.

Early life and education 
Culberson was born to Democratic politician David Browning Culberson and Eugenia Culberson and on June 10, 1855 in Dadeville, Alabama. Culberson's family moved to Texas in 1856, settling first in Gilmer and later in Jefferson.

Culberson attended Virginia Military Institute, graduating in 1874, and subsequently studied law at the University of Virginia at Charlottesville in 1876 and 1877. In 1877 he was admitted to the bar in Daingerfield, Texas, and commenced practice in Jefferson, later moving to Dallas in 1887.

Political career

Texas state politics 
Culberson's political career began with his election as Attorney General of Texas in 1890, a position he held until 1895, after campaigning for and winning the governor's race in November 1894. After two terms as governor, he was elected to the U.S. Senate as a Democrat on January 25, 1899.

Senate tenure 
Early during his tenure, he served on the Lodge Committee investigating war crimes in the Philippine–American War. Later, he chaired several senate committees, including the judiciary committee, which he chaired from 1913 to 1919. Culberson was opposed to demands for racial equality, stating that efforts to do so would lead to the "consequent debasement, degradation or destruction of the white race".

Culberson was reelected in 1905, 1911, and, again, by popular vote in 1916, when health problems and alcoholism prevented him from campaigning in Texas but did not prevent his reelection. However, his health and opposition to the Ku Klux Klan finally led to the loss of his seat in the Democratic primary in 1922.

He was succeeded by fellow Democrat Earle Bradford Mayfield, the outgoing member of the Texas Railroad Commission.

Death and legacy 
Culberson lived in retirement until his death from pneumonia in Washington, D.C. on March 19, 1925.  He is buried in East Oakwood Cemetery in Fort Worth, Texas.

Culberson was a distant cousin of John Culberson, who represented  between 2001 to 2019.

References

 

|-

|-

|-

|-

|-

|-

|-

|-

|-

1855 births
1925 deaths
Democratic Party governors of Texas
Democratic Party United States senators from Texas
People from Dadeville, Alabama
People from Dallas
People from Longview, Texas
Texas Attorneys General
People from Jefferson, Texas